Vincent Simone (born 15 March 1979) is an Italian professional dancer, who has appeared as a professional dancer on Strictly Come Dancing from 2006 until 2012. He moved to Guildford, Surrey, United Kingdom when he was 17. Simone and professional partner Flavia Cacace perform under the brand name Vincent and Flavia.

Early life
Simone was born into a family of professional dancers and his parents are Latin and ballroom dancers. Simone's partner, Susan Duddy, a former flight attendant, gave birth to their son Luca in 2009 and Matteo in September 2013. On 18 July 2015, Simone and Duddy wed at Castle Leslie in County Monaghan, Ireland. The wedding was initially misreported by Hello! Magazine, as occurring in Derry, Northern Ireland.

Strictly Come Dancing

Highest and lowest scoring performances per dance

Simone has appeared on the BBC's Strictly Come Dancing since the fourth series, where he danced with Louisa Lytton as his celebrity partner. They were knocked out in week 10, scoring 31 out of 40 for their first dance and 28 for the second. This gave them a total of 59 points, which left them in last place. Simone returned for the fifth series in 2007, partnering with actress Stephanie Beacham, but the pair were eliminated in the second week, losing to Letitia Dean and Darren Bennett in the dance off. One judge, Arlene Phillips, voted to save Beacham and Simone, but was outvoted by the other three judges.

After their success in the Strictly Live Tour! 2008, Simone and Lytton were chosen to take part in the Eurovision Dance Contest 2008 in September 2008. Dancing to '"Paint it Black" by Lee Mead, they were ranked ninth out of fourteen couples by a professional jury, and finished ninth overall when the results of the public vote had been added.

In the sixth series of Strictly Come Dancing, Simone partnered singer Rachel Stevens. They reached second place in the final, losing out to Tom Chambers and Camilla Dallerup.

Simone was partnered with actress Natalie Cassidy in the seventh series of the show. The couple were voted off on 28 November 2009, coming in fifth place.

In the eighth series in 2010, he partnered Felicity Kendal; they were voted off on 14 November, finishing in 8th place.

In September 2011, Simone returned as one of the male professional dancers in the ninth season. On the launch night of SCD, which was broadcast on 10 September, Simone was revealed to be the professional dance partner to former MP, author and broadcaster, Edwina Currie. However, the couple were eliminated first on 9 October 2011, and came in last place.

In 2012, Simone partnered Tracy Beaker actress, Dani Harmer. They reached the final and came fourth. Cacace won the series with her partner Louis Smith.

On 1 June 2013, Cacace announced that she and Simone would not be competing in Strictly Come Dancing  that year so they could work on other shows.

Louisa Lytton

Stephanie Beacham

Rachel Stevens

Natalie Cassidy

Felicity Kendal

Edwina Currie

Dani Harmer

I'm a Celebrity...Get Me Out of Here!
Simone competed in the thirteenth series of ITV's thirteenth series in 2013. He joined 'camp' on Day 5 with Annabel Giles and finished in tenth place, being the third celebrity to leave in a double elimination on Day 17, 3 December 2013.

Titles

Career titles he and his partner Flavia Cacace have earned from competitions:

 UK Professional Ten Dance Champions 2002-2006
 UK Professional Showdance Champions 2003-2006
 Negracha club UK Argentine Tango Champions, 2006
 IDO World Argentine Tango Finalists, 2005/2006 (3rd place overall - winners, Show Tango section)
 UK Ballroom Champions
 World and European Ten Dance and Showdance finalists 2002–2006

References

External links
 Vincent Simone and Flavia Cacace's official website
 Strictly Come Dancing homepage

Living people
English people of Italian descent
1979 births
I'm a Celebrity...Get Me Out of Here! (British TV series) participants